Linaria is a genus of almost 200 species of flowering plants, one of several related groups commonly called toadflax. They are annuals and herbaceous perennials, and the largest genus in the Antirrhineae tribe of the plantain family Plantaginaceae.

Taxonomy
Linaria was traditionally placed in the family Scrophulariaceae. Phylogenetic analysis has now placed it in the vastly expanded family Plantaginaceae.

Closely related genera include Nuttallanthus (American toadflaxes, recently split from Linaria), Antirrhinum (snapdragons) and Cymbalaria (ivy-leaved toadflaxes).

Cultivation
Several Linaria species are cultivated as garden plants, and some are regarded as having a weedy habit. 

Common toadflax or butter-and-eggs (Linaria vulgaris), a European species which is widely introduced elsewhere and grows as a common weed in some areas. 
Broomleaf toadflax or Dalmatian toadflax (Linaria genistifolia, syn. L. dalmatica), a native of southeast Europe that has become a weed in parts of North America.
Purple toadflax (Linaria purpurea), a species native to the Mediterranean region grown as a garden plant for its dark purple or pink flowers. The version with purple flowers can be mistaken for lavender. Spreads readily.
Pale toadflax (Linaria repens), a species from western Europe similar to L. purpurea, but with paler flowers.
Alpine toadflax (Linaria alpina), purple flowers with orange (or purple) lobes in the center. 
Moroccan toadflax (Linaria maroccana), the flower has five lobes arranged into two lips with a spur at the end, often purple with white.

Species
The following species are recognised in the genus Linaria:

Linaria accitensis 
Linaria acutiloba 
Linaria aeruginea 
Linaria afghanica 
Linaria alaica 
Linaria albifrons 
Linaria algarviana 
Linaria alpina 
Linaria altaica 
Linaria amethystea 
Linaria amoi 
Linaria angustissima 
Linaria antilibanotica 
Linaria arcusangeli 
Linaria arenaria 
Linaria arenicola 
Linaria argillicola 
Linaria armeniaca 
Linaria arvensis 
Linaria atlantica 
Linaria azerbaijanensis 
Linaria badachschanica 
Linaria badalii 
Linaria bamianica 
Linaria becerrae 
Linaria bessarabica 
Linaria biebersteinii 
Linaria bipartita 
Linaria bipunctata 
Linaria bordiana 
Linaria boushehrensis 
Linaria brachyphylla 
Linaria bubanii 
Linaria bungei 
Linaria buriatica 
Linaria caesia 
Linaria capraria 
Linaria cavanillesii 
Linaria chalepensis 
Linaria clementei 
Linaria confertiflora 
Linaria corifolia 
Linaria × cornubiensis 
Linaria cossoniana 
Linaria cossonii 
Linaria cretacea 
Linaria dalmatica 
Linaria damascena 
Linaria decipiens 
Linaria depauperata 
Linaria diffusa 
Linaria dissita 
Linaria × dominii 
Linaria dumanii 
Linaria elegans 
Linaria elymaitica 
Linaria fallax 
Linaria farsensis 
Linaria fastigiata 
Linaria faucicola 
Linaria fedorovii 
Linaria ficalhoana 
Linaria flava 
Linaria genistifolia 
Linaria gharbensis 
Linaria glacialis 
Linaria glauca 
Linaria golestanensis 
Linaria grandiflora 
Linaria griffithii 
Linaria grjunerae 
Linaria guilanensis 
Linaria haelava 
Linaria hepatica 
Linaria heratensis 
Linaria hirta 
Linaria hohenackeri 
Linaria huteri 
Linaria × hybrida 
Linaria iconia 
Linaria ikonnikovii 
Linaria imzica 
Linaria incarnata 
Linaria incompleta 
Linaria intricata 
Linaria iranica 
Linaria × jalancina 
Linaria japonica 
Linaria jaxartica 
Linaria joppensis 
Linaria kavirensis 
Linaria khalkhalensis 
Linaria khorasanensis 
Linaria × kocianovichii 
Linaria kokanica 
Linaria kulabensis 
Linaria kurdica 
Linaria latifolia 
Linaria laxiflora 
Linaria leptoceras 
Linaria lineolata 
Linaria loeselii 
Linaria longicalcarata 
Linaria macrophylla 
Linaria macroura 
Linaria maroccana 
Linaria maymanica 
Linaria mazandaranensis 
Linaria melampyroides 
Linaria melanogramma 
Linaria meyeri 
Linaria michauxii 
Linaria micrantha 
Linaria microsepala 
Linaria multicaulis 
Linaria munbyana 
Linaria musilii 
Linaria nachitschevanica 
Linaria nigricans 
Linaria nivea 
Linaria nurensis 
Linaria nuristanica 
Linaria oblongifolia 
Linaria odora 
Linaria oligantha 
Linaria × oligotricha 
Linaria onubensis 
Linaria orbensis 
Linaria ordubadica 
Linaria pamirica 
Linaria paradoxa 
Linaria parviracemosa 
Linaria pedicellata 
Linaria pedunculata 
Linaria pelisseriana 
Linaria peloponnesiaca 
Linaria peltieri 
Linaria pinifolia 
Linaria platycalyx 
Linaria polygalifolia 
Linaria popovii 
Linaria propinqua 
Linaria pseudolaxiflora 
Linaria pseudoviscosa 
Linaria purpurea 
Linaria pyramidalis 
Linaria qartobensis 
Linaria quasisessilis 
Linaria reflexa 
Linaria remotiflora 
Linaria repens 
Linaria ricardoi 
Linaria riffea 
Linaria × rocheri 
Linaria rubioides 
Linaria sabulosa 
Linaria salangensis 
Linaria salzmannii 
Linaria saposhnikovii 
Linaria saturejoides 
Linaria saxatilis 
Linaria schelkownikowii 
Linaria schirvanica 
Linaria semialata 
Linaria × sepium 
Linaria sessilis 
Linaria simplex 
Linaria spartea 
Linaria striatella 
Linaria supina 
Linaria tarhunensis 
Linaria tenuis 
Linaria thibetica 
Linaria thymifolia 
Linaria tingitana 
Linaria tonzigii 
Linaria triornithophora 
Linaria triphylla 
Linaria tristis 
Linaria tursica 
Linaria unaiensis 
Linaria × valdesiana 
Linaria venosa 
Linaria ventricosa 
Linaria veratrifolia 
Linaria verticillata 
Linaria virgata 
Linaria viscosa 
Linaria volgensis 
Linaria vulgaris 
Linaria warionis 
Linaria weilleri 
Linaria yunnanensis 
Linaria yusufeliensis 
Linaria × zaborskiana 
Linaria zaissanica

Etymology
The members of this genus are known in English as toadflax, a name shared with several related genera. The 'toad' in toadflax may relate to the plants having historically been used to treat bubonic plague, a false link having been drawn between the words 'bubo' and 'Bufo'. The scientific name Linaria means "resembling linum" (flax), which the foliage of some species superficially resembles.

Distribution and habitat
The genus is native to temperate regions of Europe, northern Africa and Asia, with the highest species diversity in the Mediterranean region.

Ecology
Some Linaria are regarded as noxious weeds. They are likely toxic to livestock, but ruminants generally avoid them.

Chemical composition

Linaria species are rich in alkaloids, iridoids, terpenes, phenolic acids and flavonoids.

Vasicine, Vasicinone, 7-hyrdoxyvasicine, Linarinic acid, Choline, Linavuline, Luteolin, Acacetin, Apigenin, Chrysin, Quercetin, Myricetin, Linarioside, Aucubin, Linaride, Iridolinaroside A-D, Iridolinarin A-C are some compounds found in plants of this genus.

Uses
Toadflaxes are used as food plants by the larvae of some Lepidoptera species, including the mouse moth (Amphipyra tragopoginis) and the common buckeye (Junonia coenia).

Traditional medicine
Linaria vulgaris has been used as a medicinal herb.

References

Bibliography
 A Phylogeny of Toadflaxes (Linaria Mill.) Based on Nuclear Internal Transcribed Spacer Sequences: Systematic and Evolutionary Consequences. Mario Fernández-Mazuecos, José Luis Blanco-Pastor, and Pablo Vargas. International Journal of Plant Sciences, Vol. 174, No. 2 (February 2013), pp. 234–249 Published by: The University of Chicago Press, Article DOI: 10.1086/668790
 Vargas P, JA Rosselló, R Oyama, J Güemes. 2004 Molecular evidence for naturalness of genera in the tribe Antirrhineae (Scrophulariaceae) and three independent evolutionary lineages from the New World and the Old. Plant Systematics and Evolution 249:151–172.

 
Plantaginaceae genera
Taxa named by Philip Miller